Tajag (also Romanized as Tajak; also known as Tījak, Tijg, and Tūj) is a village in Khusf Rural District, Central District, Khusf County, South Khorasan Province, Iran. At the 2006 census, its population was 113, in 34 families.

References 

Populated places in Khusf County